In United States politics, the Freedom of Choice Act was a bill which sought to codify into law for women a "fundamental right to choose to bear a child; terminate a pregnancy prior to fetal viability; or terminate a pregnancy after viability when necessary to protect her life or her health". It sought to prohibit a federal, state, or local governmental entity from denying or interfering with a woman's right to exercise such choices; or discriminating against the exercise of those rights in the regulation or provision of benefits, facilities, services, or information. Provides that such prohibition shall apply retroactively. It also authorizes an individual aggrieved by a violation of this Act to obtain appropriate relief, including relief against a governmental entity, in a civil action". 

The bill was introduced to the Congress in 1989, 1993, 2004 and 2007 (/).

Findings sections 
The bill asserts in its findings section that Congress has the affirmative power to legislate abortion based, in part, on the crossing of state lines by abortion providers, women seeking abortions, and medical supplies used in abortions.

Status and sponsorship 

The bill was first introduced to the Congress in 1989 and again in 1993. It was reintroduced in 2004 in the 108th Congress, on January 21 in the House of Representatives and on January 22 in the Senate.

The 2004 version was sponsored in the House of Representatives by Jerrold Nadler, and originally co-sponsored by James Greenwood, Louise Slaughter, and Diana Degette. In the Senate, it was sponsored by Barbara Boxer, and originally co-sponsored by Senators Jon Corzine, Patty Murray, Frank Lautenberg, Hillary Clinton, Maria Cantwell, Jim Jeffords, Joseph Lieberman, Dianne Feinstein, Paul Sarbanes, and Barbara Mikulski.

The bills were referred to the Judiciary Committees of the respective Houses. Neither bill received further action in the 108th Congress. The bills were reintroduced on April 19 2007 in the 110th Congress (/), but, like their predecessors, were referred to committee without further action. The bills have not been introduced in the 111th Congress (2007/09).

During his tenure in the United States Senate, Barack Obama co-sponsored the 2007 Senate version of the Freedom of Choice Act. Responding to a question regarding how he would preserve reproductive rights in a speech given to the Planned Parenthood Action Fund on July 17, 2007, Obama declared, "The first thing I'd do, as president, is sign the Freedom of Choice Act. That's the first thing that I'd do."

In a press conference on April 29, 2009, President Obama said that although he supports a woman's right to choose to have an abortion, passage of the Freedom of Choice Act was not his “highest legislative priority".

Description and criticism 
The bill is described by NARAL Pro-Choice America president Nancy Keenan as a bill to "codify Roe v. Wade" which would "repeal the Bush-backed Federal Abortion Ban", referring to the Partial-Birth Abortion Ban Act, and "other federal restrictions". Opponents of FOCA assert that it would, if passed, invalidate every restriction on abortion nationwide, including parental notification laws, informed consent laws, and bans on partial birth abortion. However, the bill would still prohibit partial birth abortions due to the wording of the bill and the stated definition of viability, the stage of pregnancy when there is a reasonable likelihood of the sustained survival of the fetus outside of the woman.

The U.S. Conference of Catholic Bishops (USCCB) has been strongly opposed to the Freedom of Choice Act. According to the USCCB's Secretariat for Pro-Life Activities, FOCA would not only "codify the Supreme Court's 1973 decision in Roe v. Wade" but "in allowing and promoting abortion, FOCA goes far beyond even Roe".

Opponents of FOCA assert that the bill would force taxpayers to subsidize abortion and would jeopardize existing laws prohibiting abortions in public hospitals and barring non-physicians from performing abortions. Others estimate that the passage of FOCA would result in approximately 125,000 more abortions being performed annually in the United States. Some opponents argue that FOCA would effectively repeal the Hyde Amendment, a federal law which bars the use of federal funding for abortions in some cases. Legal scholar Douglas Kmiec, a pro-life Republican, disagrees with the latter assertion, noting that the Hyde Amendment is renewed annually by Congress; Kmiec argues that this legislation would not supersede it.

Those who oppose the Act interpret it as an attempt to obligate religious hospitals to either "do abortions or close", while FOCA supporters argue that existing conscience clause laws would protect religious hospitals. In early 2009, Catholic News Service asserted that in its interpretation of the legislation, FOCA neither poses any such risk to Catholic hospitals, nor would require religious hospitals to participate in abortion. Opponents, however, assert that conscience clauses are weak and easily reinterpreted, and do not explicitly allow religious hospitals to ban the abortion procedure within the hospital.

The election of Barack Obama, an advocate of the Freedom of Choice Act, to the presidency caused pro-life organizations to organize against the bill in early 2009. Notable campaigns that were organized include Americans United for Life's petition to Congress called Fight FOCA and the "What the FOCA?!" campaign created by Students for Life of Illinois. Although he promised Planned Parenthood in 2007 that “the first thing I’d do as president” would be to sign it, by May 2009 he said the bill is “not my highest legislative priority”.

References

External links 
 Freedom of Choice Act (Introduced in Senate)  - Text of Senate bill S 2020 IS (2004)
 Freedom of Choice Act (Introduced in House)  - Text of House bill HR 3719 IH (2004)
 Freedom of Choice Act (Introduced in Senate)  - Text of Senate bill S 1173 IS (2007)
 Freedom of Choice Act (Introduced in House)  - Text of House bill HR 1964 IH (2007)

Proposed legislation of the 108th United States Congress
Proposed legislation of the 110th United States Congress
United States proposed federal abortion legislation
United States federal legislation articles without infoboxes